Singapore Idol was a Singaporean reality television singing competition produced by MediaCorp Studios and FremantleMedia Operations BV. It began airing on MediaCorp Channel 5 on 9 August 2004 until 27 December 2009, as an addition to the Idol franchise based on the British show Pop Idol, and became one of the most popular shows in the history of Singaporean television.

The concept of the series is to find new solo recording artists where the winner is determined by the viewers. The series employed a panel of judges who critique the contestants' performances. The original four judges during season 1 were singer/songwriter Dick Lee, Florence Lian, record producer Ken Lim and singer Douglas Oliverio. 

In season 2, all the judges from season 1 returned to the show except for Oliverio who was replaced by singer Jacintha Abisheganaden. In season 3, Abisheganaden left the judging panel and the rest of the judges returned to the show. From the start, the show has been hosted by Singapore celebrity and funnyman Gurmit Singh. Radio deejay Daniel Ong was the co-host of the show for season 2, while season 2 winner Hady Mirza replaced him as the co-host during season 3. Through telephone and SMS text voting, Singaporean viewers chose Taufik Batisah, Hady Mirza and Sezairi Sezali as winners throughout the three seasons.

Season 1 (2004)
Season 1 of Singapore Idol premiered on the National Day of Singapore (9 August) in 2004. This season produced a few memorable, albeit notorious, performers during the audition round. They included Skyy Sia aka Bananaman, who wore a mask of watermelon and bananas; Kelvin Sim, who accompanied his very bad rendition of Fool's Garden's "Lemon Tree" with a dance that rivalled that of William Hung; and Patrick Khoo, who literally whispered George Michael's "Careless Whisper".

As with other shows in the Idol series, the viewers' votes decide who goes on to the next round. This has always produced controversial results in every singing competition. In the third preliminary round, Jerry Ong, whose singing was described by judge Florence Lian as being "constipated" and "weak", was voted through to the finals, beating favourites Beverly Lim Morata and Nur "Nana" Hasanah, both of whom were thought to be better singers. Candice Foo, who got into the finals from the second preliminary round, withdrew from the contest at the last minute due to "financial difficulties". In a bigger upset, Jeassea K. Thyidor, considered by many to be a frontrunner in the competition, was eliminated in the very first round of the finals by a small margin of 200 votes. This sparked a brief, two-week anti-Jerry campaign that lasted until his elimination on 15 October 2004. In the final weeks of the Spectaculars, many speculated that Olinda Cho, one of the most consistent performers, would go on to the Grand Finals with Taufik Batisah, but Sylvester Sim, who had been in the Bottom Group more than anyone else, made it through instead in a upset.

In the final showdown held at the Singapore Indoor Stadium on 1 December 2004, Taufik beat Sylvester with 62% of the votes to become the first Singapore Idol. The song both Taufik and Sylvester were required to sing was I Dream. Both received recording deals from Sony BMG on the same day. Taufik's album, Blessings, was released on 17 January 2005. Sylvester's album, Take Flight, was released on 8 April 2005. Another finalist, Maia Lee, also released an album titled Emotionally Advised on 20 August 2005. Sylvester was granted a release from Hype Records in mid-2006 due to personal problems. Daphne Khoo also release her debut album 'Desperate' in 2008 and won Best Breakout Solo Artiste, and EP 'Wonderland' in early 2014.

Top 11 Weekly Song Themes
Top 11 theme: Parents' Choice
Top 9 theme: Rock 'N' Roll
Top 8 theme: Live Disco
Top 7 theme: Song by Favorite Singer
Top 6 theme: Big Band
Top 5 theme: R&B/Soul
Top 4 theme: Asian Pop
Top 3 theme: Movies and Musicals
Top 2 theme: Judges' Choice, Contestant's Choice and Winner's Single

Finalists
(ages stated at time of contest)

Elimination Chart

Season 2 (2006)
Auditions for season 2 were held on 11 February 2006 at *Scape in Orchard Road and was extended twice due to overwhelming response – 12 February at the same location and 19 February in Toa Payoh. The season premiered on 21 May 2006 with clips of the auditions. Dick Lee, Florence Lian and Ken Lim returned as judges while Douglas Oliverio was replaced by Jacintha Abisheganaden. After widespread criticism of his hosting abilities in season 1, Gurmit Singh was paired with Daniel Ong as co-hosts for season 2. Season 1 fourth place finalist Daphne Khoo hosted Singapore Idol on Demand, an online subscription service that provided media downloads and exclusive footage of the show.

A day after the results for Piano Show No. 4 were announced, MediaCorp revealed that a computer glitch in the voting process had mistakenly sent Mathilda D'Silva into the top 12, instead of Nurul Maideen. Mathilda was placed in the wildcard show and was subsequently voted into the finals via the Wildcard. Shortly after the technical glitch fiasco, frontrunner and wildcard contestant Meryl Joan Lee announced her withdrawal from the competition to focus on her studies.

The Top 12 finalists were housed in Hangout @ Mount Emily, a budget hotel, for as long as they remained in the competition. Once the contestant is eliminated on the results night, he/she will head back immediately to Mount Emily to pack up his/her belongings and head back home.

Every Wednesday from 12 July 2006 until the Grand Finale, the Idols competed in the Spectaculars, with a specific theme every week, for instance "No. 1 Hits" and "British Invasion". On the following day (13 July 2006), "Singapore Idol Extra" showed viewers behind-the-scene footage of Singapore Idol. During the Results show later, viewers were entertained with a live group performance, a music video of the Idols and guest appearances.

The Final Showdown for the title featured Jonathan Leong and Hady Mirza singing three songs each at the Singapore Indoor Stadium. Due to the frequency jam that took place in the first season, the finals was held on 2 separate days; the performance show on 24 September at 8:00pm, and the results show on 25 September at 8:00pm. One of the songs which both contestants sang was "You Give Me Wings", which became the winner's first single. On 25 September 2006, 26-year-old Hady Mirza was declared the winner of Singapore Idol 2006 with about 70% of the votes cast. Hady's self-titled debut album was released in mid-November 2006. Hady would then go on to compete in Asian Idol and become the first Asian Idol on 16 December 2007 in an upset victory.

Top 12 Weekly Song Themes
Top 12 theme: Parents' Choice
Top 11 theme: #1 Hits from 1996–2006
Top 10 theme: Classic Jazz
Top 9 theme: Songs by British Singers/Bands
Top 8 theme: Home, Family and Friends
Top 7 theme: Rock 'N' Roll
Top 6 theme: Asian Pop
Top 5 theme: R&B and Soul
Top 4 theme: Judges' Choice
Top 3 theme: Contestant's Favourites
Top 2 theme: Contestant's Choice from Judges' List, Spectaculars Encore & Winner's Single

Finalists
(ages stated at time of contest)

Elimination Chart

Season 3 (2009)
On 15 December 2008, MediaCorp mentioned in its free-circulating-paper, TODAY, that Singapore Idol Season 3 would be one of the new programmes for 2009. The third season comes three years after the previous.

Registration for Singapore Idol 3 officially started on 1 May 2009, and the season premiered right after the National Day Parade segment on 9 August 2009, 8:30 pm on Channel 5, with subsequent episodes on Wednesdays at 8:00pm from 12 August.

Returning host Gurmit Singh co-hosted with Singapore Idol 2 winner Hady Mirza, replacing Season 2's Daniel Ong. The returning judges were Dick Lee, Florence Lian and Ken Lim, with Jacintha Abisheganaden leaving the show.

The Top 100 contestants were put up at Orchid Country Club for a week of intense auditions and training. They were then reduced to a Top 76 for a group round, Top 54 for an Idol first where the contestants write and compose a duet and perform it, then the Top 40 of sang-off at Caldecott Hill. Top 24 consisted of half the contestants (6 males and 6 females) performing each night on 2 separate Piano Shows for a spot in the Top 12. The Piano Show has no theme, and contestants can sing any song they want. The Results Show was screened 30 minutes after the Performance Show. Voting began at the start of the Piano round at 8:00 pm, and closed at 9:45 pm (later extended to 10:00 pm and finally to 10:15 pm). The Top 3 public vote-getters, regardless of gender, advanced together with 3 of the judges choices per episode. Coincidentally, in the piano shows, all the contestants who made it to the next round by public voting were male contestants. There was no Wild Card round for previously eliminated contestants, unlike the previous two seasons.

After the Top 12 was revealed during the second Piano Show results segment, the judges announced that Mae Sta Maria would join the 12 and form a surprise Top 13. The season has received mixed to negative feedback from fans due to the new rulings (absence of the Wildcard round, lack of a gender cap and voting beginning at the start of the show rather than at the end).

It was revealed on 14 September that MJ Kuok, who had gotten into the finals by public voting after Piano Show 1, had withdrawn from the competition on 11 September, citing "personal reasons". The news was confirmed in 8 Days Magazine. He was then replaced by Nurul Huda from Piano Show 1. It was revealed that she had received the next highest number of public votes out of all the other eliminated contestants.

This season also introduced the "Judges' Save", similar to American Idol Season 8, which could be used only when the judges unanimously decide to save an eliminated contestant up to and until the Top 5. The save was never used, when the judges decided not to save Faizal Isa, who was eliminated in 5th place. In retrospect, except for the Top 13 Results Show, where Gurmit explicitly asked the judges if they wanted to save Syltra Lee, the judges' save was hardly, if only briefly, mentioned.

Another first for the franchise was a surprise non-elimination round during the Top 4 Results Show on 25 November, similar to American Idol Season 6, although, unlike the American version where the bottom group was never revealed, Charles and Tabitha were first revealed to be the bottom two before they were announced as safe. Votes for that week were added to the following week's votes, with the contestant with the lowest-combined (Charles) being eliminated the following week.

The order for the final performance show was decided by a coin toss immediately after the Top 3 results show. Sylvia won and decided to go first. The Grand Finale, unlike Season 2, was not a two-night event. The performance was aired at 8:00 pm on 27 December 2009 and the results show at 10:00 pm on the same day. It was held at the Singapore Indoor Stadium with a full capacity of 12,000. The special guest was international recording artist Charice where she performed 3 songs which included her first single Note to God. The Singapore Idol stage will be torn down from the MediaCorp TV Theatre permanently thereafter.

This season was abound with controversy. During the Top 8 and 7, while the judges claimed both nights as "girls' nights", the girls filled up the bottom groups. This resulted in extensive media promotion for the females left in the competition, and the idea of a female idol was fuelled by both the judges and the episodic trailers. However, the last male standing in the Final 3, Sezairi Sezali, still ultimately won, receiving 61% of the votes cast in the finale. While Sylvia became the first female to make it to the finals, Sezairi's win makes all three Singapore Idol winners young Malay males.

Piano Shows

Group 1

 Group performance: "Wanna Be Startin' Somethin'"
 Nurul Huda was originally eliminated but was invited back to the competition as a replacement of MJ Kuok, who withdrew from the competition after being voted into the top 13 by the public.

Group 2

 Group performance: "Burnin' Up"

Spectacular Shows

Top 13 – Chart Toppers

 Group performance: "I Don't Care"

Top 12 – The Year I Was Born

 Group performance: "You Give Me Wings"

Top 11 – An Asian Feast

Top 10 – A Tribute to Michael Jackson

 Group performance: "Black or White"
On the results show, the "bottom two" was not announced. Gurmit Singh first revealed that Charles, Nurul and Malaque were in the "bottom three". Gurmit then eliminated Nurul immediately and the other contestant which was in the "bottom two" together with Nurul was not revealed.

Top 9 – For Someone Special
This week, the contestants each perform a song to dedicate to somemore in their life (e.g. friend, family member etc)

 Group performance: "Just Stand Up!"
On the results show, no "bottom three" was announced as the voting results were announced in "random order". Gurmit Singh announced the safe contestants one by one. After Sylvia, Faizal, Malaque, Duane, Tabitha and Sezairi were announced as safe, Charles, Mae and Amira were the last three remaining. Gurmit Singh then eliminated Amira immediately. Charles and Mae were not necessarily among the bottom three vote-getters that week.

Top 8 – Mambo Mania

 Group performance: "Just Can't Get Enough"

Top 7 – My Folks Love This
This week, the contestants perform a song selected by their parents.

 Group performance: "Ain't No Mountain High Enough"

Top 6 – Killing Me Softly (with This Song)

 Group performance: "Boys and Girls"

Top 5 – You Asked for It
The contestants are each given a list of songs chosen by the public (a different list for each contestant). They each chose a song from their list to sing.

 Group performance: "I Gotta Feeling"

On the results show, the "bottom two" was not announced. Gurmit Singh first revealed that Charles and Tabitha were in the "bottom three". Gurmit then eliminated Faizal immediately and the other contestant which was in the "bottom two" together with Faizal was not revealed.

Top 4 (first week) – A Song for a Cause
In this week, being a week before World AIDS Day, the contestants each sing compose their own songs to perform as well as a cover song to play their part for charity.

On the results show, Gurmit Singh first revealed that Tabitha and Charles were in the "bottom two". However, the two contestants were then declared safe together with Sylvia and Sezairi and no one was eliminated. Gurmit Singh stated that it was a surprise non-elimination round and votes for that week would be carried over to the following week. The contestant with the lowest combined votes over the two weeks would be eliminated the following week.

Top 4 (second week) – Step Up and Dance!

 Group performance: "Dance Floor Anthem (I Don't Want to Be in Love)"

Top 3 – Judges' Choice

Top 2 – Favourite Performance / Contestant's Choice / Winner's Single

 Group performance: "I Gotta Feeling" / "Bad Romance" / "Boom Boom Pow"

Elimination chart

Post-Idol
Of the 13 Finalists, only the Top 3 contestants have continued to remain in the public eye. Sezairi Sezali and Sylvia Ratonel have released their debut studio albums, Take Two and Sylvia Ratonel respectively. Singles were released from the album and have made it into the Top 10 on the 987FM Top 20 Chart, with the best-performing single being Sylvia Ratonel's "It's Raining" (it peaked at #3). While Tabitha Nauser has not released an album, she collaborated with international artists Sean Kingston, Steve Appleton, Jessica Mauboy and Jody Williams on the official theme song to the 2010 Youth Olympics, "Everyone". Nauser was given the opening lines of the first verse, and her vocals can be heard harmonising with the other artists in the choruses and bridge. The song was released as a CD single, which included an acoustic version of "Everyone" performed by Nauser alone. Successful airplay of the song made "Everyone" reach No. 1 on the 987FM Top 20 Chart, making Tabitha Nauser the first Singaporean vocalist, at least in recent years, to achieve that feat. "Everyone" remained on the top spot for 2 weeks.

References

External links
Singapore Idol Official Website

2004 Singaporean television series debuts
Idols (franchise)
Singaporean reality television series
Singaporean singing competitions
Television series by Fremantle (company)
2009 Singaporean television series endings
Non-British television series based on British television series
Channel 5 (Singapore) original programming